Belgium competed at the 1928 Winter Olympics in St. Moritz, Switzerland.

Medalists

Bobsleigh

Figure skating

Men

Pairs

Ice hockey

Group A
The top team (highlighted) advanced to the medal round.

References

 Olympic Winter Games 1928, full results by sports-reference.com

Nations at the 1928 Winter Olympics
1928
Olympics, Winter